"Over My Head" is a song by American singer Toni Basil. It was featured on her self-titled 1983 album, and reached number 81 on the Billboard Hot 100 and number 4 on the US Dance chart.

Release
"Over My Head" was the second single from Toni Basil's 1983 album Toni Basil. The song was released as a 12" record by Chrysalis and Virgin Records. The song was also featured on her 1994 greatest hits compilation The Best of Toni Basil: Mickey & Other Love Songs.

Music video
A music video for the song was released, directed by Basil and Michelle Simmons.

Synopsis
The video starts with Basil dancing in front of several paperback mystery novels, before being zapped into one of the books. She is suddenly featured in a dark room, clad in vampire-like fashion. She then appears on the cover of another mystery novel, before she is shown stuck on train tracks as a train flies over her. The train suddenly becomes a plane. Basil finally escapes the books and continues dancing in front of them.

Accolades
The video was nominated for "Best Choreography" at the first MTV Music Video Awards, in 1984. The video lost, however, to Michael Jackson's "Thriller."

Commercial performance
The song reached number 81 on the Billboard Hot 100, spending a total of 6 weeks on the chart; it was her final single to reach the Hot 100. The song also went to number 4 on the US Dance chart. "Over My Head" was the final charting single that Basil's record label, Radial Choice, had before folding in 1984.

Charts

References

Toni Basil songs
1983 songs
1983 singles
A&M Records singles
Songs written by Franne Golde
Song recordings produced by Mike Chapman
Music videos directed by Toni Basil